The men's middleweight competition in powerlifting at the 1997 World Games took place on 8 August 1997 in Lahti, Finland.

Competition format
A total of 7 athletes entered the competition. Each athlete had 3 attempts in each of 3 events: squat, bench press and deadlift. Athlete, who came with the biggest score in Wilks points is the winner.

Results

References

External links
 Results on IWGA website

Powerlifting at the 1997 World Games